Laurent Recouderc was the defending champion and he won this edition too. He defeated 6–3, 6–4 Jan Hájek in the final.

Seeds

Draw

Final four

Top half

Bottom half

References
 Main Draw
 Qualifying Draw

Polska Energia Open - Singles
ZRE Katowice Bytom Open